Siglo XX was a Belgian Coldwave, Darkwave and Gothic rock group from Genk active from 1978-1991.  The group's sound was influenced by music of Joy Division and Factory Records.  Siglo XX was one of the more well-known Belgian coldwave bands and by 2010 was considered to have been a key influence on the Belgian music scene.  The group's name in Spanish means "twentieth century".  It can both be pronounced as Siglo Iks Iks or as Siglo Veinte and reportedly stems from an anarchist movement during the Spanish Civil War and/or a Bolivian mine named Siglo XX that was the scene of social unrest.

Members
Erik Dries, "vocals"
Antonio Palermo, "guitar"
Dirk Chauvaux, "guitar, bass"
Klaas Hoogerwaard, "drums"
Chris Nelis, "synthesizer" (1980–1982)
Guido Bos, "bass" (1978–1984)

Discography

"The Naked And The Death" (7" - 1980) 

"The Naked And The Death"
"Lines Of Hope"
"Individuality"

"Siglo XX"  (K7 - 1981) 

"Whispers"
"Fall"
"Obsession"
"Future"
"Factory"
"Calculated Mistakes"
"Good News"
"Progress"
"Caraïbean Nightmares"

The Art Of War (12" - 1982) 

"The Art Of War"
"La Vie Dans La Nuit"
"Youth Sentiment"
"Autumn"

Answer (Mini-LP - 1983) 

"Answer"
"After The Dream"
"The Room"
"Until A Day"
"Endless Corridor"
"Dreams Of Pleasure"

Dreams Of Pleasure (12" - 1983) 

"Dreams Of Pleasure"
"In The Garden"
"Silent House"

In The Garden (7" - 1984) 

"In The Garden"
"Silent House"

Live sides / Studio sides (2 LP - 1984)

Disc 1 

"Some Have A Laughter"
"Guilt And Desire"
"Moving Creatures"
"Babies On A Battlefield"
"The Fiddle"

Disc 2 

"Fools"
"Obsession"
"Whispers"
"The Room"
"Birds"
"Into The Dark"
"Progress"
"The Beginning"
"The Art Of War"

Re-Released 1980-1982 (LP - 1984) 

"The Naked And The Death"
"The Art Of War"
"Lines Of Hope"
"Youth Sentiment"
"Obsession"
"Factory"
"La Vie Dans La Nuit"
"Individuality"
"Autumn"
"Caraibian Nightmare"
"The Fall"

It's All Over Now (12" - 1986) 

"It's All Over Now"
"Fear"
"Babies On A Battlefield"
"Death-Row"

Till The End Of The Night (12" - 1987) 

"The End Of The Night"
"Deadman's Cave"
"The Beginning"

Flowers For The Rebels (CD - 1987) 

"Sister In The Rain"
"Fear"
"No One Is Innocent"
"Afraid To Tell"
"Sister Suicide"
"Till The Act Is Done"
"Shadows"
"Flesh And Blood"
"Ride"
"The End Of The Night"
"Dead Man's Cave"
"The Beginning"

View Of The Weird (12" - 1987) 

"View Of The Weird"
"Silent Crowd"

Antler Tracks I (CD - 1987) 

"Answer"
"After The Dream"
"The Room"
"Until A Day"
"Endless Corridor"
"Dreams Of Pleasure"
"Some Have A Laughter"
"Guilt And Desire"
"Moving Creatures"
"Babies On A Battlefield"
"The Fiddle"
"It's All Over Now"
"Fear"
"Babies On A Battlefield"
"Death Row"

Antler Tracks II (CD - 1987) 

"The Naked And The Death"
"Lines Of Hope"
"Individuality"
"Obsession"
"Factory"
"Caraibean Nightmares"
"The Art Of War"
"La Vie Dans La Nuit"
"Youth Sentiment"
"Autumn"
"Dreams Of Pleasure"
"In The Garden"
"Silent House"
"The Room" (live)
"Into The Dark" (live)
"Progress" (live)
"The Beginning" (live)
"The Art Of War" (live)

Fear And Desire (CD - 1988) 

"Fear And Desire"
"Everything Is On Fire"
"Lost In Violence"
"Sorrow And Pain"
"35 Poems"
"On The Third Day"
"My Sister Called Silence"
"The Pain Came"

Summers Die (12" - 1989) 

"Summers Die"
"Waiting For A Friend"

Under A Purple Sky (CD - 1989) 

"Baby Divine"
"When Will It Be Me"
"I Send You My Tears"
"Untouchable Flame"
"Body Meets Body"
"Alice"
"Vanity Lane"
"City In Dust"

1980-1986 (CD - 2006) 

"The Naked And The Death"
"Individuality"
"Obsession"
"La Vie Dans La Nuit"
"Autumn"
"Until A Day"
"Endless Corridor"
"Dreams Of Pleasure"
"In The Garden"
"Silent House"
"Some Have A Laughter"
"Guilt And Desire"
"Babies On A Battlefield"
"It's All Over Now"
"The Room" (live)
"The Beginning" (Live)
"The Art Of War" (Live)

Siglo XX (LP - 2010) 

"A1 Whispers"
"A2 Fall"
"A3 Obsession"
"A4 Future"
"A5 Factory"
"A6 Calculated Mistakes"
"B1 Good News"
"B2 Progress"
"B3 Caraïbean Nightmares"
"B4 No Communication"
"B5 Into The Dark

References

External links
Website with biography and discography
The Belgian Pop & Rock Archives

Belgian rock music groups
Belgian electronic music groups
Belgian industrial music groups